Kid Twist may refer to: 

Kid Twist (rapper), Canadian hip hop musician 
Max Zwerbach (1884–1908), New York gangster and later successor of Monk Eastman 
Abe Reles (1906–1941), New York mobster, member of Louis "Lepke" Buchalter's Murder Inc, and later government informant